(1537 – 1626), famously known as , was a Japanese Shin Buddhist priest within Hongan-ji. He led on the defence of Siege of Ishiyama Hongan-ji between 1570 and 1580. During that time the temple was in conflict from Oda Nobunaga. Rairen played a role in the peace treaty with Nobunaga and later moved to the region of Tenmangū to serve Honganji Kennyo and Hideyoshi.

References

1537 births
1626 deaths
Jōdo Shinshū Buddhist priests
Azuchi–Momoyama period Buddhist clergy
Edo period Buddhist clergy